The 2010–11 season is Hull City's first season back in the Championship after relegation from the Premier League in the 2009–10 season.

Players

Current squad

Transfers
This section only lists transfers and loans for the 2010–11 season, which began 1 July 2010. For transactions in May and June 2010, see transfers and loans for the 2009–10 season.

In

Out

Loans

In

Out

2010–11 Squad statistics
Updated 7 May 2011.

Awards
Anthony Gerrard was named as player of the year.
Liam Rosenior came second and Matty Fryatt came third.

John Bostock's goal against Swansea in the first match of the season being voted goal of the season.

Pre season

Preseason friendlies

Championship

Hull City's return to the Championship after two seasons in the Premier League.

August–December
Pearson brought several transfers and loans into the club in his bid to strengthen the squad for the season's campaign. One of those efforts yielded quick results on the season's opening day, as loanee John Bostock from Tottenham Hotspur supplied the first of two winning goals over Swansea City. Team captain Ian Ashbee, returning from injury that kept him sidelined much of the preceding season, supplied the second.

After weeks of speculation about a local business man looking to be interested in investing in Hull City, it was confirmed on 18 October 2010 that Assem Allam, along with his son Ehab had entered negotiations with Hull City owner and chairman, Russell Bartlett. Allam confirmed at the time that he felt the need to pay back to the area, and that Hull City were important to the area.
On 10 November 2010, it was confirmed by the Allams that a deal had been agreed for a controlling interesting in the club, and that the Allams would assume control once the relevant requirements had been met.

Whilst it was originally reported that Allam intended to only purchase a majority shareholding in the club, and would continue to work with Russell Bartlett, a protracted period of due diligence indicated that the investment required would be substantially higher than originally planned; this resulted in a move to completely seize control of the club. The deal was formally completed at 10.45 pm on 16 December 2010, with the club exchanging hands for the nominal fee of £1, but with Allam, and his son, Ehab committing to invest £30 million, as well as providing assurances for a further £10 million.

Following the takeover, it was confirmed on the official club website that Assem Allam would take up the roll of chairman at the club.

January–June
On Saturday 12 March 2011, Hull set a new record for the club, with 14 away matches unbeaten, breaking a record stretching back over 50 years.

Results

Results by round

League table

FA Cup

Hull City were drawn at home against Premier League club Wigan Athletic in the third round draw of the FA Cup that took place on 28 November 2010.

Results

League Cup

Hull City received a bye in the first round of the League Cup drawn on 16 June 2010. For the second round, Hull City drew League One side Brentford for an away game played on 24 August, which they lost by a score of 2–1.

Results

Kits

Hull City's kits for the 2010–11 season are manufactured by German sports apparel company Adidas. The away kit was revealed on 3 July 2010 to be all white with amber trim. The home kit, revealed on 10 July 2010, comprises:
jersey with black and amber stripes on the front, solid amber on the back, and black trim on the shoulder
black shorts and socks with amber trim
The sponsor for the front of the jerseys remained The Tote, its trademarks totesport.com printed on the front of the home jersey and totesport on the front of the away jersey. On 3 August 2010, the club announced two additional sponsorship agreements:
the name of a local law firm will appear on the back of both the home and away jerseys
the name and logo of a laboratory supply company will appear on the back of both the home and away shorts

References

2010-11
2010–11 Football League Championship by team
2010-11 Hull City A.F.C. Season